Minara Station can refer to:
Minara Station (Ehime), a railway station in Ehime Prefecture, Japan
Minara Station (Western Australia), a pastoral lease in Western Australia